In geometry, a parallelohedron is a polyhedron that can be translated without rotations in 3-dimensional Euclidean space to fill space with a honeycomb in which all copies of the polyhedron meet face-to-face. There are five types of parallelohedron, first identified by Evgraf Fedorov in 1885 in his studies of crystallographic systems: the cube, hexagonal prism, rhombic dodecahedron, elongated dodecahedron, and truncated octahedron.

Classification
Every parallelohedron is a zonohedron, constructed as the Minkowski sum of between three and six line segments. Each of these line segments can have any positive real number as its length, and each edge of a parallelohedron is parallel to one of these generating segments, with the same length. If the length of a segments of a parallelohedron generated from four or more segments is reduced to zero, the result is that the polyhedron degenerates to a simpler form, a parallelohedron formed from one fewer segment. As a zonohedron, these shapes automatically have 2 Ci central inversion symmetry, but additional symmetries are possible with an appropriate choice of the generating segments.

The five types of parallelohedron are:
A parallelepiped, generated from three line segments that are not all parallel to a common plane. Its most symmetric form is the cube, generated by three perpendicular unit-length line segments.
A hexagonal prism, generated from four line segments, three of them parallel to a common plane and the fourth not. Its most symmetric form is the right prism over a regular hexagon.
The rhombic dodecahedron, generated from four line segments, no two of which are parallel to a common plane. Its most symmetric form is generated by the four long diagonals of a cube.
The elongated dodecahedron, generated from five line segments, one of which is parallel to a common plane with two disjoint pairs of the other four. It can be generated by using an edge of the cube and its four long diagonals as generators.
The truncated octahedron, generated from six line segments with four sets of three coplanar segments. It can be embedded in four-dimensional space as the 4-permutahedron, whose vertices are all permutations of the counting numbers (1,2,3,4). In three-dimensional space, its most symmetric form is generated from six line segments parallel to the face diagonals of a cube.

Any zonohedron whose faces have the same combinatorial structure as one of these five shapes is a parallelohedron, regardless of its particular angles or edge lengths. For example, any affine transformation of a parallelohedron will produce another parallelohedron of the same type.

Symmetries
When further subdivided according to their symmetry groups, there are 22 forms of the parallelohedra. For each form, the centers of its copies in its honeycomb form the points of one of the 14 Bravais lattices. Because there are fewer Bravais lattices than symmetric forms of parallelohedra, certain pairs of parallelohedra map to the same Bravais lattice.

By placing one endpoint of each generating line segment of a parallelohedron at the origin of three-dimensional space, the generators may be represented as three-dimensional vectors, the positions of their opposite endpoints. For this placement of the segments, one vertex of the parallelohedron will itself be at the origin, and the rest will be at positions given by sums of certain subsets of these vectors. A parallelohedron with  vectors can in this way be parameterized by  coordinates, three for each vector, but only some of these combinations are valid (because of the requirement that certain triples of segments lie in parallel planes, or equivalently that certain triples of vectors are coplanar) and different combinations may lead to parallelohedra that differ only by a rotation, scaling transformation, or more generally by an affine transformation. When affine transformations are factored out, the number of free parameters that describe the shape of a parallelohedron is zero for a parallelepiped (all parallelepipeds are equivalent to each other under affine transformations), two for a hexagonal prism, three for a rhombic dodecahedron, four for an elongated dodecahedron, and five for a truncated octahedron.

History
The classification of parallelohedra into five types was first made by Russian crystallographer Evgraf Fedorov, as chapter 13 of a Russian-language book first published in 1885, whose title has been translated into English as An Introduction to the Theory of Figures. In the case of parallelohedra, Fedorov assumed without proof that every parallelohedron is centrally symmetric, and used this assumption to prove his classification. The classification of parallelohedra was later placed on a firmer footing by Hermann Minkowski, who used his uniqueness theorem for polyhedra with given face normals and areas to prove that parallelohedra are centrally symmetric.

Related shapes 
In two dimensions the analogous figure to a parallelohedron is a parallelogon, a polygon that can tile the plane edge-to-edge by translation.
These are parallelograms and hexagons with opposite sides parallel and of equal length.

In higher dimensions a parallelohedron is called a parallelotope. There are 52 different four-dimensional parallelotopes, first enumerated by Boris Delaunay (with one missing parallelotope, later discovered by Mikhail Shtogrin), and 103769 types in five dimensions. Unlike the case for three dimensions, not all of them are zonotopes. 17 of the four-dimensional parallelotopes are zonotopes, one is the regular 24-cell, and the remaining 34 of these shapes are Minkowski sums of zonotopes with the 24-cell. A -dimensional parallelotope can have at most  facets, with the permutohedron achieving this maximum.

A plesiohedron is a broader class of three-dimensional space-filling polyhedra, formed from the Voronoi diagrams of periodic sets of points. As Boris Delaunay proved in 1929, every parallelohedron can be made into a plesiohedron by an affine transformation, but this remains open in higher dimensions, and in three dimensions there also exist other plesiohedra that are not parallelohedra. The tilings of space by plesiohedra have symmetries taking any cell to any other cell, but unlike for the parallelohedra, these symmetries may involve rotations, not just translations.

References

External links
 

Space-filling polyhedra